Philippe Noël Marie Marc Étienne (born 24 December 1955) is a French diplomat who has served as Ambassador of France to the United States since 2019. He previously served as chief diplomatic adviser to the President of France, Emmanuel Macron, from 2017 to 2019. Étienne was nominated as Ambassador to the United States effective 30 May 2019.

In response to the AUKUS agreement, he was recalled to France in September 2021. The measure was unprecedented; in almost 250 years of diplomatic relations, France had never before recalled its US ambassadorship. The Biden administration tried to placate French anger. Jean-Pierre Thébault, the French Ambassador to Australia, was also recalled.

Biography
Étienne was born in Neuilly-sur-Seine, Paris. He entered the École normale supérieure in 1974, and graduated the École nationale d'administration in 1980, alongside François Hollande and Michel Sapin. He also has an agrégation in mathematics and studied Serbo-Croat at INALCO.

As a diplomat, he has served in Belgrade (1981-1983), Bonn (1985-1987), the French mission to the EU in Brussels (1988-1991 and 1997-2002), Moscow (1991-1994) and Bucharest (ambassador to Romania, 2002-2005). He has also served in various roles in Paris, notably as president of the Agency for French Education Abroad (2004-2007). He has also worked as deputy chief-of-staff to Hervé de Charette (1995-1997) and as chief-of-staff to Bernard Kouchner (May 2007-April 2009). In the latter role, he was closely involved in the 2008 G20 Washington summit following the financial crisis of 2007–2008, the evacuation of French citizens from Tbilisi during the Russian invasion of Georgia, and the French presidency of the Council of the European Union.

From 31 July 2014 he served as French ambassador to Germany. In April 2017, he was designated to replace Jean-Maurice Ripert as French ambassador to Russia, but was instead appointed diplomatic adviser to President Emmanuel Macron on 14 May. Étienne’s appointment was widely interpreted as signaling a desire for close ties to Germany and the EU.

He was made a knight of the Légion d'honneur on 22nd 2003, and was promoted to officer on 1 January 2013. He was made a knight of the National Order of Merit on 14 May 1994.

Besides French, Étienne speaks English, German, Serbo-Croat, Russian and Romanian.

He was nominated in May 2019 by President Emmanuel Macron as ambassador of France in the United States effective September 2019.

Notes

References

1955 births
Living people
People from Neuilly-sur-Seine
Ambassadors of France to the United States
Ambassadors of France to Germany
École Normale Supérieure alumni
École nationale d'administration alumni
INALCO alumni
Officiers of the Légion d'honneur
Knights Commander of the Order of Merit of the Federal Republic of Germany